Matthew Roberton Battersby (18 December 1841 – 15 May 1899) was a politician in Queensland, Australia.

Early life 
Battersby was born in Perth, Scotland, the son of Andrew Battersby and Elizabeth Gloag. He immigrated from Scotland to Queensland 1865 where continued his trade as a blacksmith until he settled on a property in Caboolture. He had two sons and three daughters.

Politics 
Battersby was a member of the Caboolture Divisional Board for 9 years.

Battersby elected as a member of the Queensland Legislative Assembly in the electorate of Moreton on 17 May 1888 during the 1888 Queensland colonial election. He was re-elected unopposed in the 1893 election and won the 1896 election. However, he lost the seat on 18 March 1899 to John Dunmore Campbell in the 1899 election.

Later life 
On 15 May 1899, Battersby died suddenly at his home in Eagle Junction, Brisbane, from a rupture of an artery to the brain. Although his death was sudden, he had been suffering a complication of diseases for some time.

See also 
 Members of the Queensland Legislative Assembly, 1888–1893; 1893–1896; 1896–1899

References

Members of the Queensland Legislative Assembly
1841 births
1899 deaths
19th-century Australian politicians